Herbert Charles Banet (October 17, 1913 – March 12, 2003) was an American football player in the National Football League and high school basketball coach, teacher, and guidance counselor.

Biography
Banet was born October 17, 1913, in Fort Wayne, Indiana.

Football career
Banet played with the Green Bay Packers during the 1937 NFL season. He played at the collegiate level at Manchester University.

Basketball career
Banet was a head basketball coach and teacher at Central High School in Fort Wayne. He was an inductee of the Indiana Basketball Hall of Fame.

Personal and later life
Banet served in the United States Navy during the World War II era.  He was married to Kathlyn Maude Stevens (1916-2001), and together they had four children: Stevens, David, Thomas, and Sarah. Banet became a guidance counselor at Northrup High School and retired in 1979. He died March 12, 2003, at Renaissance Village and is buried at Falls Memorial Gardens in Wabash, Indiana.

See also
List of Green Bay Packers players

Footnotes

1913 births
2003 deaths
Green Bay Packers players
High school basketball coaches in Indiana
Manchester Spartans football players
Players of American football from Fort Wayne, Indiana
United States Navy sailors
United States Navy personnel of World War II